Siegfried Nagl (born 18 April 1963, in Graz) is an Austrian politician with the Austrian People's Party (ÖVP). He was mayor of Graz from 2003 to 2021.

He was one of the many witnesses to the 2015 Graz van attack that killed three and injured more than 30.

He is Knight of Honor of the Order of St. George.

References

External links 
 Nagl's CV, hosted by the city of Graz

1963 births
Living people
Mayors of places in Austria
Politicians from Graz